Inca bonplandi is a species of beetles of the family Scarabaeidae.

Description

Distribution
This species can be found in Brazil.

References

Cetoniinae
Beetles described in 1817